Tobias Beer is an English screenwriter and actor.

Early life 
Born in Cambridge, he studied at Oxford University and the Webber Douglas Academy of Dramatic Art. While at Oxford University, he won a blue in rugby union, scoring 11 points in their 1999 16–13 victory over Cambridge University in The Varsity Match.

Acting 
He has worked predominantly in the theatre, and his credits include: Great Expectations, Merry Wives of Windsor (with Judi Dench, Simon Callow and Alistair McGowan), Twelfth Night and The Comedy of Errors (all for the Royal Shakespeare Company); The Changeling for Cheek by Jowl, directed by Declan Donnellan; Cymbeline, Twelfth Night, Macbeth and A Midsummer Night's Dream for the Open Air Theatre, Regent's Park In 2015 he returned to the RSC in Death of a Salesman.

Writing 

In 2019 he co-created, wrote and executive produced the television drama The Deceived for Channel 5, Virgin Media Ireland and Netflix.

Personal life 
He is married to the writer Lisa McGee.

References

External links
Review in The Times
Review in The Daily Telegraph

Date of birth missing (living people)
Living people
People educated at Eton College
English male stage actors
Alumni of the Webber Douglas Academy of Dramatic Art
People from Cambridge
Alumni of the University of Oxford
Male actors from Cambridgeshire
Year of birth missing (living people)